Wang Guan (born 16 February 1987) is a Chinese modern pentathlete. He competed at the 2012 Summer Olympics.

References

External links
 

1987 births
Living people
Chinese male modern pentathletes
Olympic modern pentathletes of China
Modern pentathletes at the 2012 Summer Olympics
Athletes from Liaoning
Sportspeople from Anshan
Asian Games medalists in modern pentathlon
Modern pentathletes at the 2010 Asian Games
Asian Games silver medalists for China
Medalists at the 2010 Asian Games
20th-century Chinese people
21st-century Chinese people